West Orange may refer to:

Places
 West Orange, New Jersey, a township in Essex County
 West Orange, Texas, a city in Orange County

Schools
 West Orange High School (New Jersey), a public school in West Orange, New Jersey
 West Orange High School, Winter Garden, a public school in Winter Garden, Florida
 West Orange Public Schools, a public school system in West Orange, New Jersey
 West Orange-Cove Consolidated Independent School District, a public school system in Orange County, Texas
 West Orange-Stark High School, a high school of the West Orange-Cove Consolidated ISD

Other uses
 West Orange Trail, a multi-use trail in Orange County, Florida